Roberts's warbler (Oreophilais robertsi), also known as the briar warbler, is a species of bird in the family Cisticolidae.  It is found in the Eastern Highlands of Zimbabwe and Mozambique.  Its natural habitats are subtropical or tropical moist montane forest and subtropical or tropical moist shrubland.

References

 Ryan, Peter. (2006). Family Cisticolidae (Cisticolas and allies). pp. 378–492 in del Hoyo J., Elliott A. & Christie D.A. (2006) Handbook of the Birds of the World. Volume 11. Old World Flycatchers to Old World Warblers'' Lynx Edicions, Barcelona

External links
 Roberts's warbler - Species text in The Atlas of Southern African Birds.

Roberts's warbler
Birds of East Africa
Vertebrates of Zimbabwe
Vertebrates of Mozambique
Robert's warbler
Robert's warbler
Taxonomy articles created by Polbot
Fauna of South Africa
Endemic fauna of South Africa
Fauna of the Eastern Highlands